MacDowell is an artist's residency program in Peterborough, New Hampshire, United States, founded in 1907 by composer Edward MacDowell and his wife, pianist and philanthropist Marian MacDowell. Prior to July 2020, it was known as the MacDowell Colony (or simply "the Colony") but the Board of Directors shortened the name to remove "terminology with oppressive overtones".

After Edward MacDowell died in 1908, Marian MacDowell established the artists' residency program through a nonprofit association in honor of her husband, raising funds to transform her farm into a quiet retreat for creative artists to work. She led the organization for almost 25 years.

Over the years, an estimated 8,300 artists have been supported in residence with nearly 15,000 fellowships, including the winners of at least 86 Pulitzer Prizes, 31 National Book Awards, 30 Tony Awards, 32 MacArthur Fellowships, 15 Grammys, 8 Oscars, 828 Guggenheim Fellowships, and 107 Rome Prizes. The artists' residency program has accepted visual and interdisciplinary artists, architects, filmmakers, composers, playwrights, poets, and writers, both well-known and unknown. Since January 2020, Nell Painter has served as chair of MacDowell, the first woman to hold the position.

History 
In 1896, pianist Marian MacDowell bought Hillcrest Farm in Peterborough, New Hampshire, as a summer residence for herself and her husband, composer Edward MacDowell. She had always been careful to give him a quiet room for his work. They found that the New Hampshire landscape enhanced his work of composing music.

The couple formulated a plan to provide an interdisciplinary experience in a nurturing landscape, by creating an institutionalized residential art colony in the area. In 1904, Edward MacDowell began to show signs of an illness that ended his composing and teaching career. He died in 1908.

In 1907, Marian MacDowell deeded their farm to the Edward MacDowell Association and founded the MacDowell Colony. The first guests arrived that year: sisters Helen Farnsworth Mears, a sculptor, and Mary Mears, a writer. Mears wrote about her time on site for The Craftsman in July 1909. MacDowell began by inviting applicants personally, but by the 1920s had consigned the admission process to a committee.

Marian and friends raised funds and found support from industrialist and philanthropist Andrew Carnegie, former U.S. President Grover Cleveland, financier J. P. Morgan, other prominent people, as well as many others across the country. MacDowell said the most consistent support came from women's clubs and professional music sororities (see, for example, the MacDowell Club of New York). At the age of 50, MacDowell began lecturing to women's groups to raise funds, resumed her performing career, and  became a noted interpreter of her husband's work.

Elizabeth Sprague Coolidge organized an effort in 1916 to build and name a studio at MacDowell in memory of her teacher Regina Watson. It was renovated in 1993 and became McDowell's first barrier-free studio that was accessible to everyone.

By 1918, 31 of Isabelle Sprague Smith's students funded the creation of the Isabelle D. Sprague Smith studio. Through the years more separate studios were built.

On March 13, 2020, the MacDowell shut in the face of the COVID-19 outbreak and sent artists and Fellows home. It was the first time the site had shut since the 1938 New England hurricane.

Medal Day 
Every year, MacDowell presents the Edward MacDowell Medal to an artist who has made a significant cultural contribution. Residency at MacDowell is not a requirement. In 2019, the 60th Medal was awarded to a visual artist. Medal Day is one of the rare occasions when the site is open to the public. The ceremony includes a keynote speech, after which the artists open their studios to visitors.

Property-tax dispute
MacDowell, a non-profit organization, enjoys the status of a charity, entitling it to exemption from local property taxes, among other things. However, in 2005, the town of Peterborough's selectmen (local-government executives) decided to challenge MacDowell's charitable status and billed the organization for a "payment in lieu of taxes". A lawyer for the town argued that "the Colony certainly benefits its artists-in-residence, but that doesn't strike us as being the general public."

The then-Board of Directors paid the bill, then successfully challenged the charge. A 2007 Superior Court opinion found that the MacDowell Colony, by promoting the arts, was a charitable institution, a ruling that was upheld by the New Hampshire Supreme Court in a subsequent appeal. The appeal court found that "Contrary to the Town's assertions, MacDowell's articles of incorporation oblige it to use its property for its stated charitable purpose."

Awards
In 1962, the site and buildings were designated a National Historic Landmark District.

In 1997, MacDowell Colony was awarded the National Medal of Arts.

Notable works 

 Aaron Copland worked there on composing the orchestral suite Appalachian Spring (1944), a 1945 Pulitzer winner.
 Spalding Gray worked on his novel The Impossible Vacation, and later chronicled his experiences in his extended monolog Monster in a Box.
 Leonard Bernstein completed his Mass.
 Thornton Wilder wrote Our Town and The Bridge of San Luis Rey.
 James Baldwin wrote Giovanni's Room.
 Willa Cather wrote Death Comes for the Archbishop.
 DuBose and Dorothy Heyward wrote Porgy and Bess.
 Virgil Thomson worked on The Mother of Us All.
 Alice Walker worked on her first novel and Meridian. 
 Michael Chabon wrote The Amazing Adventures of Kavalier & Clay, a 2001 Pulitzer winner. Chabon served as chairman of the board from 2010 to 2020.
 Alice Sebold wrote The Lovely Bones.
 Jonathan Franzen completed The Corrections.

See also

List of National Historic Landmarks in New Hampshire
National Register of Historic Places listings in Hillsborough County, New Hampshire
New Hampshire Historical Marker No. 206: The MacDowell Graves

References

Further reading

 New England Historical Society, "Marian MacDowell Founds the MacDowell Colony"

External links 

MacDowell
Records of the MacDowell Colony, Library of Congress

Artist residencies
Artist colonies
Peterborough, New Hampshire
Buildings and structures in Hillsborough County, New Hampshire
United States National Medal of Arts recipients
American art
1907 establishments in New Hampshire
National Historic Landmarks in New Hampshire
Historic districts on the National Register of Historic Places in New Hampshire
 
Houses in Hillsborough County, New Hampshire
National Register of Historic Places in Hillsborough County, New Hampshire